Sheriff John  was an American children's television host who appeared on KTTV in Los Angeles from July 18, 1952, to July 10, 1970, on two separate series, Sheriff John's Lunch Brigade and Sheriff John's Cartoon Time. He was played by John Rovick who served as a radio operator-gunner in the United States Army Air Corps in World War II, surviving 50 combat missions in the European Theater of Operations. After the war he became a radio announcer, moving to television in its early days. He developed the program's concept himself.

As Sheriff John he began each program entering his office, singing "Laugh and be happy, and the world will laugh with you." He then said the Pledge of Allegiance and read a safety bulletin. He showed cartoons including Q.T. Hush, Underdog, Crusader Rabbit, and Porky Pig; he was often visited by farm animals. An artist, Sketchbook Suzie, drew pictures requested by viewers; he would complete squiggles sent by the children and make a squiggle for them to complete. He also gave them lessons on safety and good health habits.
  
The show's highlight was the birthday celebration. Sheriff John read as many as 100 names, then brought out a cake and sang the Birthday Party Polka ("Put Another Candle on my Birthday Cake").

In 1979, Rovick reprised his Sheriff John character on KTTV, briefly hosting a Sunday morning version of the TV series, TV POWWW. He won an Emmy Award in 1952 and appeared on the Emmy broadcast in 1998, introduced by longtime fan Michael Richards. In 1981 Rovick retired from KTTV after 32 years. On October 6, 2012, he died in Boise, Idaho, after a brief illness. He had just turned 93 years old.

See also
 List of local children's television series (United States)

References

External links
 TV Party's Sheriff John site
 

1952 American television series debuts
1970 American television series endings
1950s American children's television series
1960s American children's television series
1970s American children's television series
American children's television presenters
Local children's television programming in the United States
People from Dayton, Ohio
1919 births
2012 deaths